The Brinks, Northwold or Northwold Meadows is a  biological Site of Special Scientific Interest south of Northwold in Norfolk, England.

These unimproved meadows have areas of tall herbs and grassland grazed by cattle and sheep. There are also areas of woodland and several ponds. More than 140 flowering plants have been recorded, including  green-winged orchid, black knapweed and pepper saxifrage.

The site is private land with no public access.

References

Sites of Special Scientific Interest in Norfolk
Northwold